is a Japanese manga series written and illustrated by Syun Matsuena. It has been serialized in Shogakukan's shōnen manga magazine Weekly Shōnen Sunday since February 2018, with its chapters collected in 24 tankōbon volumes as of February 2023.

Plot
Eito Akashi has somehow failed every high school entrance exam. That is because an agency has kept him from doing so, so he can enter their school for training agent. Uninterested at first, he discovers his father was an agent. Wanting to find the cause of his father's death, he enters the school, armed only with his determination.

Characters

Eito is a normal person but is very determined and hard working. He is very selfless and will risk his life to save others. Eito joins the academy to find out more about his father, who was an agent, and to find the cause of his death. While not gifted like other students, he is very observant and quick to improvise.

Ayame is a prodigy, often followed by her pet owl Koton. She shows little emotion and is socially awkward, but becomes cold when on missions. It is later revealed she comes from a long-line of assassins, but she was rescued by Eito's father.

Publication
Kimi wa 008, written and illustrated by Syun Matsuena, started in Shogakukan's shōnen manga magazine Weekly Shōnen Sunday on February 21, 2018. In May 2021, it was announced that the manga entered its climax. Shogakukan has collected its chapters into individual tankōbon volumes. The first volume was released on May 18, 2018. As of February 16, 2023, twenty-four volumes have been released.

Volume list

Reception
By November 2018, the manga had 170,000 copies in circulation. By March 2019, the manga had 220,000 copies in circulation.

See also
Kenichi: The Mightiest Disciple, another manga series by the same author
Waza no Tabibito, another manga by the same author
Tokiwa Kitareri!!, another manga series by the same author

References

External links
  

Action anime and manga
Espionage in anime and manga
Shogakukan manga
Shōnen manga